Borthwick is a surname of Scottish origin. Notable people with the surname include:

 Alastair Borthwick
 Albert William Borthwick (1872–1937), Scottish botanist and professor of forestry at the University of Aberdeen
 Algernon Borthwick, 1st Baron Glenesk
 Bill Borthwick - see William Borthwick below
 David Borthwick, Australian public servant
 Emily Borthwick (born 1997), British high jumper
 Gabrielle Borthwick (1866–1952), pioneering motorist and mechanic
 Jack Borthwick (Australian footballer) (1884–1948), Australian rules footballer
 Jack Borthwick (footballer, born 1886) (1886–1942), Scottish football centre half
 Jamie Borthwick (born 1994), English actor 
 John Borthwick (disambiguation)
 John Borthwick (footballer) (born 1964), English footballer
 John Borthwick (veterinary surgeon) (1867–1936), veterinary surgeon in the Cape Colony, South Africa
 Sir John Thomas Borthwick, 3rd Baronet (1917–2002) of the Borthwick baronets
 John Borthwick, 5th Lord Borthwick (died 1566)
 John Borthwick, 8th Lord Borthwick (died 1623)
 John Borthwick, 9th Lord Borthwick (1616–1675) (dormant 1675)
 John David Borthwick
 John David Borthwick (1824–1892), Scottish journalist and author
 John Henry Stuart Borthwick, 23rd Lord Borthwick (1905–1996) (confirmed in title 1986)
 John Hugh Borthwick, 24th Lord Borthwick (born 1940)
 Mamah Borthwick
 Mark Borthwick
 Peter Borthwick
 Ruth Borthwick, chair of English PEN
 Scott Borthwick
 Stephen Borthwick (Headmaster of Epsom College)
 Steve Borthwick, English international rugby union player
 Walter Borthwick (1948–2021), Scottish football player and manager

William Borthwick
 William Borthwick, 1st Lord Borthwick (died 1458), Scottish peer and ambassador
 William Borthwick, 2nd Lord Borthwick (died 1483), Scottish ambassador to England
 William Borthwick, 3rd Lord Borthwick (died 1503), Scottish nobleman and ambassador
 William Borthwick, 4th Lord Borthwick (died 1542), Scottish nobleman
 William Jason Maxwell Borthwick (1910–1998), British Royal Navy officer
 William Borthwick (mayor) (1848–1928), mayor of Ottawa, 1895–1896
 Bill Borthwick (1924–2001), Australian politician

References

Scottish toponymic surnames
Surnames of Lowland Scottish origin